The Scarlet Pimpernel is a musical with music by Frank Wildhorn and lyrics and book by Nan Knighton, based on the 1905 novel of the same name by Baroness Orczy. The show is set in England and France during the Reign of Terror of the French Revolution.  The story is a precursor to the spy fiction and the superhero genres, where a hero hides under a mild-mannered alias.

The musical ran on Broadway from 1997 through January 2000 in several theatres, in several revised versions. It also had a US National tour.

Productions 
The Scarlet Pimpernel started as a workshop with Carolee Carmello as Marguerite and directed by Nick Corley, following a concept album (and Top 40 Adult Contemporary Hit - "You Are My Home").

The musical debuted on Broadway at the Minskoff Theatre on October 7, 1997 in previews, officially on November 9, 1997. Directed by Peter H. Hunt, it starred Douglas Sills  (Sir Percy Blakeney), Christine Andreas (Marguerite St. Just), Terrence Mann (Citizen Chauvelin),  Marine Jahan (Madame St. Cyr), Tim Shew (St. Cyr), Elizabeth Ward (Marie), Philip Hoffman (Tussaud), James Judy (Dewhurst), Sandy Rosenberg (Lady Digby), Pamela Burrell (Lady Llewellyn), Gilles Chiasson (Armand St. Just), Ed Dixon (Ozzy), Allen Fitzpatrick (Farleigh), Bill Bowers (Leggett), Adam Pelty (Elton), Ron Sharpe (Hal), William Thomas Evans (Hastings), Dave Clemmons (Ben), R.F. Daley (Neville), David Cromwell (Robespierre/Prince of Wales/Fisherman), Ken Labey (Grappin), Eric Bennyhoff (Coupeau), Jeff Gardner (Mercier), James Dybas (Jessup), Melissa Hart (Helene), and Alison Lory (Chloe).

In June shortly before the Tony Awards were announced, the show was slated to close. The show's fans known as "The League" decided it should have another try.  With falling ticket sales, the show ushered in new producers and reopened with Sills and two new leads, Rex Smith and Rachel York and a vastly rearranged production in October 1998 (a year after the previous opening). The show closed at the Minskoff Theatre on May 30, 1999. It had a mini-tour of a scaled-down version in the Summer of 1999 with three new leads. The revised version (called the 3.0 version) opened on Broadway at the Neil Simon Theatre on September 7, 1999, closing on January 2, 2000 for a grand total of 772 performances and 39 previews. The cast starred Ron Bohmer, Marc Kudisch and Carolee Carmello.  Like Wildhorn's two other big budget Broadway efforts (Jekyll & Hyde and The Civil War), the musical closed having lost money.

A US National tour began on February 20, 2000, through April 1, 2001, directed and choreographed by Robert Longbottom with Douglas Sills re-creating his role and with Amy Bodnar as Marguerite and William Paul Michals as Chauvelin.  Sills was replaced by Robert Patteri and finally Ron Bohmer.

The musical has had numerous regional US productions and has been produced in Germany, Finland, the Netherlands, United Kingdom, Ireland, Sweden, Canada, Mexico, Malta, and Norway, among others.

It has also been produced by the Japanese Takarazuka Revue, which had previously commissioned Never Say Goodbye from Frank Wildhorn in 2006, under the guidance of Wildhorn himself. Wildhorn also penned two additional songs exclusively for the Takarazuka production of the show, "A Piece of Courage" and "Days of Glory". The show ran from June to October 2008 and was performed by the group's Star Troupe. It starred Kei Aran as Percy, Asuka Tono as Marguerite, and Reon Yuzuki as Chauvelin. It was performed again by the Revue from April to June 2010, this time by the Moon Troupe. Hiromu Kiriya and Yuki Aono starred as Percy and Marguerite, respectively, with Masaki Ryuu and Rio Asumi double-cast as Chauvelin. It was then again performed by the Star Troupe, from March to June 2017, starring Yuzuru Kurenai as Percy, Airi Kisaki as Marguerite and Makoto Rei as Chauvelin.

The show was also produced in Mexico City by Bernstein-Peralta Productions. It opened at Teatro Nextel del Parque on November 27, 2014 and closed on December 16, 2014. It ran for 16 performances including 1 preview. It was directed by Ricardo Diaz and the cast featured Irasema Terrazas, Luis Rene Aguirre, Yolanda Orrantia and Efrain Berry.

In October 2015 on an airing of "Frank Wildhorn & Friends" on PBS's 66th & Broadway, Wildhorn announced the musical has been in talks to be revived again in the next years.

Recordings

Commercial recordings

Concept Album (1992)
Features Chuck Wagner as Percy, Linda Eder as Marguerite and David Clemmons as Chauvelin. Orchestrations on this album are more contemporary versions than are found in other recordings of the show. Songs that are exclusive to this release are: "Home Again," "Marguerite" (Substituted later for "Where's The Girl?"), "Now When The Rain Falls," "I'll Forget You" (Would be later taken back), "Our Separate Ways" (Substituted later for "Where's the Girl?" Reprise) and "There Never Was A Time." (Substituted later for "Believe" and it's Reprise)

Original Broadway Cast Album (1998)
Features Douglas Sills as Percy, Christine Andreas as Marguerite and Terrence Mann as Chauvelin. This recording has songs from the first version of the Broadway production which had some major alterations later on.

Encore! Album (1999)
Features the same cast as the OBC Album.  Only four songs were re-recorded for this album. Rex Smith recorded "Where's The Girl" and "Falcon In The Dive" while Rachel York sings "Storybook" and "I'll Forget You." Also included are "You Are My Home," originally from the concept album, and "Only Love," originally from the OBC Album.

German Highlights (2003)
Features Christoph Goetten as Percy, Ann-Christin Elverum as Marguerite and Christopher Murray as Chauvelin.
See: http://www.castalbums.org/recordings/5205

Austrian Highlights (2007)
See: http://www.castalbums.org/recordings/7787

Norwegian Cast (2008)
See: http://www.castalbums.org/recordings/12632

Demo/Promotional recordings

Pre-Broadway Demo (1996)
Features Chuck Wagner as Percy, Linda Eder as Marguerite and Michael Lanning as Chauvelin. Similar to the concept recording above but with a few new songs and orchestrations that are not in the contemporary style that the concept recording featured. Rob Evan and others also sang on this demo. The one song exclusive to this release is "High Time."
See: http://www.castalbums.org/recordings/6619

Hungarian Promo (2007)
See: http://www.castalbums.org/recordings/6802

Plot 
The following is the current version, The Scarlet Pimpernel 4.0.

Act 1
The play opens at La Comédie Française, an elegant theatre where Marguerite St. Just is performing in her final show ("Storybook"). As she announces to the crowd her marriage to wealthy English aristocrat Sir Percy Blakeney, Citizen Chauvelin, a fanatical agent of the French republican revolutionaries, closes the theatre before the performance is finished. Percy, Marguerite, and her brother, Armand, leave for England, and Chauvelin oversees the execution of the Marquis de St.-Cyr by guillotine in the miserable streets of Paris ("Madame Guillotine").

Percy and Marguerite wed in England ("Believe"). However, on the night of their wedding, Percy learns that his wife betrayed the Marquis de St.-Cyr, his friend, to the revolutionary government ("Wedding Dance"). Heartbroken, Percy is torn between his love for Marguerite and the knowledge of what she has done ("Prayer"). The Blakeneys' marriage grows cold.

Percy determines to make amends for his friend's death by saving other innocents from the guillotine. He takes on the identity of the Scarlet Pimpernel and convinces some of his friends (subsequently called "bounders") to join him in his daring rescue attempts; Armand, Marguerite's brother, insists on being included ("Into the Fire"). The band pretend to be inane fops, effectively throwing off any suspicions about the identity of the League of the Scarlet Pimpernel. Under Percy's strict orders, Marguerite is told nothing of this.

Over the next five weeks, the League rescues many potential victims of the guillotine in Paris ("The Rescue"). The furious Robespierre orders Chauvelin to discover the identity of the Scarlet Pimpernel with the help of a Belgian spy named Grappin (Percy in disguise). Frustrated, Chauvelin vows to succeed ("Falcon in the Dive").

Back in England, Marie, Marguerite's old costume designer and best friend, has come to the Blakeney estate and is painting Percy's portrait. The Blakeneys' maids gossip about the Scarlet Pimpernel with Percy, who continues his foppish act ("Scarlet Pimpernel Transition"). Marguerite cannot understand how Percy is so drastically different from the man whom she married ("When I Look At You").

Informed that she has a visitor in the garden, Marguerite goes outside. Percy looks out at her in awe, yet remains confused about how he should act around her ("When I Look At You (Reprise)"). Marguerite's visitor turns out to be Chauvelin, who attempts to convince her to join him in his mission to unmask the Pimpernel, as the French believe he is a member of the Blakeney's circle. Percy joins the conversation and perplexes Chauvelin with his ridiculous ways. When Percy leaves, Chauvelin tries to remind Marguerite of the fiery passion they once shared for the Revolution and each other ("Where's the Girl?"). Marguerite rejects Chauvelin's advances and sends him away.

Armand, just returned from a trip for the League, tells Marguerite that he is going on another trip, this time to France. She becomes upset because she believes that Armand is putting himself in danger—and because he is the only one whom Marguerite feels truly loves her. Marguerite begs Armand to stay, but after trying to comfort her, he leaves, taking Marie back to Paris with him to assist the League ("You Are My Home").

Percy tells his remaining men that the Prince of Wales, suspicious of their trips to France, wants to meet with them. To allay the Prince's suspicions, Percy shows the League how it is a man's duty to dress elegantly and flamboyantly, and they all display the latest fashion ("The Creation of Man"). At the palace, the League convinces the Prince that they have nothing to do with the Pimpernel's activities.

Chauvelin arrives to meet with the Prince but is brushed aside so that the League can help the Prince select his attire for the royal ball that night. Having received a note from Chauvelin, Marguerite meets him at the palace, and Chauvelin once again enlists her aid. Armand has been captured in France, and Chauvelin threatens to have him guillotined if Marguerite refuses to help find the Pimpernel ("Marguerite's Dilemma (Instrumental)"). Both Marguerite and Chauvelin wonder if they can trust each other; Percy finds them talking and wonders if he, too, can trust his wife ("The Riddle").

Act 2
At the Prince's ball ("Entr'acte (Instrumental)"), Percy and the other guests discuss the Pimpernel, who they all know is there that evening ("The Scarlet Pimpernel"). Percy then recites a poem he has created in honor of the Pimpernel, and the guests join in ("They Seek Him Here").

Marguerite, desperate, convinces one of Percy's men to ask the Pimpernel to meet her on the footbridge at one o'clock ("The Gavotte"). She informs Chauvelin of the plan and goes to the footbridge. Percy comes but remains hidden in the shadows, keeping his identity concealed. Marguerite tells him of Chauvelin's plans and explains that she betrayed the Marquis de St.-Cyr under coercion. Torn, Marguerite begs the Pimpernel to escape before Chauvelin arrives, but the Pimpernel promises to save Armand and sends Marguerite away. Overjoyed, Percy now understands why he has loved Marguerite all along—and that she has always remained the same ("She Was There"). Chauvelin arrives, but Percy's antics fluster him into leaving without discovering the Pimpernel's identity. The League then sets out for France to save Armand.

Still unaware of the Pimpernel's identity, Marguerite does the same. Disguised as a tart, Marguerite attempts to uncover information about her brother, but she is quickly recognized and apprehended by Chauvelin ("Storybook (Reprise)"). While Chauvelin admires Marguerite's courageous efforts, he is angry that she was defying his threats, and he sends her to prison with Armand.

Unable to get access to Marguerite and Armand, Grappin poses a plot to Chauvelin to have Armand lead them to the secret harbor that the League uses, where they can capture the entire group. Grappin tries to convince Chauvelin to let him dispose of Marguerite, but Chauvelin orders him to stick to the plan. Alone, Chauvelin rages over his failure to win Marguerite back ("Where's the Girl? (Reprise)").

The League meets with Percy, Marie, and Tussaud (Marie's fiancé) in Paris to try to find a way to save Marguerite and Armand. Unable to get close to them, even disguised as Grappin, Percy starts to think the situation is almost hopeless. He vows to go it alone, not wanting the rest of the League to continue to risk themselves, but they reassuredly state they will stand by him ("Into the Fire (Reprise)").

In prison, Armand assures Marguerite that the Pimpernel will save them. Refusing to believe it, Marguerite mourns the loss of Percy and of her life ("I'll Forget You"). However, the two are "rescued" by "League members" and set off for the League's harbor at the coastal town of Michelon, having no idea that Chauvelin is on their trail. On the way, Marguerite learns her husband's secret identity.

At Michelon, Marguerite and Armand discover that a guillotine has been erected at the harbour. Chauvelin and his soldiers arrive, and when Marguerite desperately calls for Percy to run, Chauvelin finally begins to suspect who his adversary truly is.

Grappin turns up and informs Chauvelin that the Pimpernel—who Grappin confirms is Sir Percy Blakeney—is heading for Calais. Chauvelin sends some of his men off to intercept the Pimpernel but still keeps soldiers to assist him. When Percy "accidentally" lets his identity slip, he and Chauvelin duel. Marguerite steps in several times to help Percy, but Chauvelin still wins ("The Duel"). Percy is then immediately guillotined.

Confident in his triumph, Chauvelin sends most of his remaining soldiers away to carry the news to Robespierre, leaving only a small squad. However, to Chauvelin's utter bewilderment, Percy stands up from the guillotine unharmed. The head that fell is, in fact, a wax one that Marie (who, having married Tussaud, is revealed to be Marie Tussaud) created to fool Chauvelin. The whole duel and execution was but a ruse to lull Chauvelin into a sense of overconfidence and send the majority of his forces away. The remaining soldiers turn out to be the League in disguise.

Percy's men tie up Chauvelin and leave him with planted evidence incriminating him as the Scarlet Pimpernel. Percy, Marguerite, Armand, and the bounders then set off for England. Marguerite and Percy confide in each other the true love that they have always had for each other ("Believe (Reprise)").

Characters
 Marguerite St. Just**
 Percy Blakeney** (Grappin & The Scarlet Pimpernel)
 Chauvelin**
 Armand St. Just**
 Marie Grosholtz**
 St. Cyr*
 Tussaud
 Mercier (aide to Chauvelin)
 Coupeau (aide to Chauvelin)
 Jessup (Butler to Percy)
 Ozzy* (Bounder)
 Dewhurst* (Bounder)
 Elton* (Bounder)
 Farleigh* (Bounder)
 Hal* (Bounder)
 Ben* (Bounder)
 Prince of Wales*
 Robespierre
 Sentry (Royal Palace)
 SATB Chorus - Cupids of the Comedie Française, Soldiers, Prisoners, Paris Street Mob, Royal Ball Guests, Six Girl Servants at the Blakeney Estate

(**) five principal vocal parts 
(*) eight sub-principal vocal parts

Songs

Act I
 Overture - Orchestra
 Madame Guillotine - Citizens of Paris and Prisoners
 Believe - Percy Blakeney, Marguerite St. Just and British Chorus
 Vivez! - Marguerite St. Just, Lady Digby, Lady Llewellyn and Percy Blakeney
 Prayer - Percy Blakeney
 Into The Fire - Percy Blakeney and Percy's Men
 Falcon in the Dive - Chauvelin
 When I Look At You - Marguerite St. Just
 The Scarlet Pimpernel - Percy Blakeney, Marguerite St. Just, Marie, Armand St. Just, Lady Digby, Lady Llewellyn and Servants
 Where's the Girl? - Chauvelin
 When I Look At You (Reprise) - Percy Blakeney
 The Creation of Man - Percy Blakeney, Prince of Wales and Percy's Men
 Marguerite's Dilemma - Orchestra
 The Riddle - Chauvelin, Marguerite St. Just and Percy Blakeney

Act II
 Entr'acte - Orchestra
 They Seek Him Here - Percy Blakeney, Prince of Wales, Lady Digby and Lady Llewellyn
 Only Love - Marguerite St. Just
 She Was There - Percy Blakeney
 Storybook - Leontine and French Chorus
 Where's the Girl? (Reprise) - Chauvelin
 Lullaby - Helene and Chloe
 You Are My Home - Marguerite St. Just, Armand St. Just and French Prisoners
 The Duel - Orchestra
 Believe (Reprise) - Company
 Bows / Into the Fire (Reprise) - Company

However, changes were made to the song list after a number of previews on Broadway:

Act I
 Overture - Orchestra
 Storybook - Marguerite & Ensemble
 Madame Guillotine - Chauvelin, St. Cyr & Ensemble
 You Are My Home, Wedding Dance, Prayer - Percy, Marguerite & Ensemble
 Prayer - Percy
 Into The Fire - Percy, Armand, Ozzy, Dewhurst, Elton, Farleigh, Hal & Ben
 Falcon In The Dive - Chauvelin
 Scarlet Pimpernel Transition - Percy, Marie, Marguerite & Girls
 When I Look At You - Marguerite
 When I Look At You (Reprise) - Percy & Marguerite
 Where's The Girl? - Chauvelin
 You Are My Home (Garden Reprise) - Marguerite & Armand
 The Creation of Man - Percy, Ozzy, Dewhurst, Elton, Farleigh, Hal & Ben
 Marguerite's Dilemma - Orchestra
 The Riddle - Chauvelin, Marguerite, Percy & Ensemble

Act II
 Entr'acte - Orchestra
 Opening Act II - Percy, Marguerite & Ensemble
 The Scarlet Pimpernel
 They Seek Him Here - Percy, Marguerite, Chauvelin, Elton, Farleigh, Dewhurst, Ozzy, Prince of Wales & Ensemble
 Ouilles Gavotte
 She Was There - Percy
 Storybook (Bistro Reprise) - Marguerite & Ensemble
 Where's The Girl? (Reprise) - Chauvelin
 Into The Fire (Reprise) - Ozzy, Dewhurst, Farleigh, Elton, Hal & Ben
 I'll Forget You - Marguerite
 The Duel - Orchestra
 Finale/When I Look At You (Reprise) - Marguerite, Percy & Ensemble
 Bows/Into The Fire (Reprise) - Percy & Company
 Exit Music - Orchestra

Cast lists

Awards and nominations

Original Broadway production

Notes and references

External links
 Official website of The Scarlet Pimpernel musical
 
 Official website for the 2010 Takarazuka production (Japanese)
 Composer Frank Wildhorn's website
 Plot and production information at Tams-Witmark
 Into the Fire - The Scarlet Pimpernel

1997 musicals
Broadway musicals
French Revolution in fiction
Musicals based on novels
Musicals by Frank Wildhorn